The Ivinhema River is a river of Mato Grosso do Sul state in southwestern Brazil. It is one of the main tributaries of the western part of the Paraná River.

Forty-six different species of fish were found in seven streams in the river basin.
The lower reaches are protected by the  Rio Ivinhema State Park, created in 1998.

See also
List of rivers of Mato Grosso do Sul

References
Brazilian Ministry of Transport
 Rand McNally, The New International Atlas, 1993.

Rivers of Mato Grosso do Sul
Tributaries of the Paraná River